John Mark Tschogl (born April 25, 1950 in Chula Vista, California) is a retired American professional basketball small forward who played three seasons in the National Basketball Association (NBA) as a member of the Atlanta Hawks (1972–74) and the Philadelphia 76ers (1974–75). He was drafted by the Golden State Warriors during the 1972 NBA Draft, but was waived before the start of the season. He attended the University of California, Santa Barbara.

External links

1950 births
Living people
American men's basketball players
Atlanta Hawks players
Basketball players from California
Golden State Warriors draft picks
Philadelphia 76ers players
Small forwards
Sportspeople from Chula Vista, California
UC Santa Barbara Gauchos men's basketball players